Cayaponia tayuya (tayuya or taiuiá) is a vine that grows in the Amazon region of South America, in the nations of Brazil, Bolivia and Peru. Its roots are used in herbal medicine.

Studies in rodent models have shown that several cucurbitacins isolated from tayuya may have anti-inflammatory properties and reduce damage from arthritis. Some cucurbitacins can be made anti-rheumatic agent.

References

Flora of Bolivia
Flora of Brazil
Flora of Peru
Flora of the Amazon
Medicinal plants of South America
Cucurbitoideae